Śmigiel, Śmigieł, or Smigiel are Polish-language surnames. The  Polish word śmigiel has several meanings ultimately derived from the verb śmigać, "to move swiftly".

Notable people with these surnames include:
 Christian Smigiel (born 1977), Argentine footballer
 Hanna Smigiel, the namesake of the minor planet 38020 Hannadam, a friend of the discoverer
 Krzysztof Śmigiel (born 1974), Polish volleyball player
 Michael D. Smigiel Sr. (1958-2022), American politician

See also
 
 Schmiegel (disambiguation)
 Smigel

References

Polish-language surnames